Ghent University Hospital is one of the largest hospitals in Belgium. It is closely linked to Ghent University, the university's rector also being the hospital's president. Both the university and the hospital are autonomous entities of the Flemish Government.

The hospital has more than 1,000 beds and about 6,000 employees.

The location of the hospital is also called "Campus Heymans", named after Nobel Prize winner Corneille Heymans. Located nearby is Ghelamco Arena, a stadium that opened in 2013.

External links
 Official website

Hospitals in Belgium
Ghent University